Roderick Earl Bernstine (born February 8, 1965) is a former professional American football player who was selected by the San Diego Chargers in the 1st round (24th overall) of the 1987 NFL Draft. A 6'3", 235-lb. running back/tight end from Texas A&M, Bernstine played in 9 NFL seasons from 1987 to 1995. His best season as a pro came during the 1993 season as a member of the Denver Broncos when he rushed for 816 yards and caught 44 receptions. Due to a loophole in official NFL rules he was the only active running back allowed to wear the number 82 while playing for the San Diego Chargers, a number reserved for wide receivers and tight ends. Upon being traded to the Denver Broncos in 1993 he changed his number to 33, an official running back number.

College career
Bernstine lettered at Texas A&M from 1983–86. Before his sophomore season at Texas A&M, Bernstine reacted negatively after then-A&M coach Jackie Sherrill told him that he was being moved to tight end, after playing a year at running back. As a senior in 1986, he was named first team All-SWC at tight end. That same year, he set the school record for the most receptions in a single season with 65, a record that stood until 2010. Bernstine’s 65 catches is still the school single-season record for most ever by a tight end.

Personal
Bernstine and his ex-wife, Stephanie met at Bryan High School in Bryan, Texas. They began dating while both were students and Texas A&M University. They have two children. They all reside in the Denver, Colorado area.

Bernstine's older brother Nehames "Pookie" Bernstine played baseball for Lewis-Clark College in Lewiston, Idaho. Pookie Bernstine was selected by the Cleveland Indians in the 5th Round (118th overall) of the 1982 amateur entry draft (June-Reg).

Bernstine's son, Roderick E. Bernstine, Jr., signed a letter of intent to play basketball for University of Denver in November 2012, but transferred to the University of North Dakota after only one season. His nephew, Jordan, was a safety who formerly played for the Washington Redskins.

Notes

References

1965 births
Living people
American football running backs
American football tight ends
Denver Broncos players
San Diego Chargers players
Sportspeople from the San Francisco Bay Area
Texas A&M Aggies football players
People from Fairfield, California
Players of American football from California